= Anne's Spot =

Anne's Spot refers to a reddish-colored anticyclonic oval in Saturn's atmosphere, observed in 1980 and 1981 at 55°S by the Voyager space probes. It was probably also observed in 2004 at about 53°S by the Cassini orbiter, one-third larger east-west and with faster winds.
